Civil Rights Act may refer to several acts of the United States Congress, including:
 Civil Rights Act of 1866, extending the rights of emancipated slaves by stating that any person born in the United States regardless of race is an American citizen
 Civil Rights Act of 1871, prohibiting race-based violence against African Americans (see also Enforcement Acts, three Acts in 1870–71)
 Civil Rights Act of 1875, prohibiting discrimination in "public accommodations", which was found unconstitutional in 1883 as Congress could not regulate conduct of individuals
 Civil Rights Act of 1957, establishing the Civil Rights Commission
 Civil Rights Act of 1960, establishing federal inspection of local voter registration polls
 Civil Rights Act of 1964, prohibiting discrimination based on race, color, religion, sex, and national origin by federal and state governments as well as some public places
 Civil Rights Act of 1968, prohibiting discrimination in sale, rental, and financing of housing based on race, creed, and national origin
 Civil Rights Act of 1990, a bill that would have made it easier for plaintiffs to win civil rights cases; was vetoed by President George H. W. Bush 
 Civil Rights Act of 1991, providing the right to trial by jury on discrimination claims and introducing the possibility of emotional distress damages, while limiting the amount that a jury could award

See also 
 Civil Rights Restoration Act of 1987, specifying that recipients of federal funds must comply with civil rights laws in all areas, not just in the particular program or activity that received federal funding
 List of short titles
 Unruh Civil Rights Act, a 1959 Californian law prohibiting discrimination in housing
 Voting Rights Act of 1965

 
Lists of legislation by short title and collective title